The 11th Arizona Territorial Legislative Assembly was a session of the Arizona Territorial Legislature which convened on January 3, 1881, in Prescott, Arizona Territory.

Background
Since assuming office, Governor John C. Frémont had been mostly absent from his duties. The governor had left for Washington D.C. on February 28, 1879, to lobby the territory's case in a dispute over the boundaries of the Gila River Indian Reservation. The trip was expected to take five or six weeks to complete.   Frémont had not returned to the territory till August 1879.  The governor had again left the territory on  March 18, 1880. He did not return to Prescott till January 5, 1881.  In response to these prolonged periods with no resident territorial governor, Territorial Delegate John G. Campbell said "So far we cannot tell what sort of Governor he will make as he has spent most of his time in the East."

While he was away, the non-partisan alliance that had controlled Arizona Territory during the McCormick and Safford administrations broke down. This allowed the territory's Democratic Party to organize an effective opposition to the Republican governor.  The other signification change was the size of the legislature, which had been expanded to twelve members in the upper house and twenty-four members in the lower house.

Legislative session
The legislative session began on January 3, 1881.

Governor's address
Governor Frémont's address to the session focused upon economic development.  To this end he
called for Federal aid in building water storage systems within the territory and increased trade with Mexico.  To  encourage additional capital investment in the territory's mines, the governor requested removal of all taxes levied on mining products.  On other issues, Frémont recommended divorces be handled by the courts.

The regular address was followed on February 21, 1881, by a special message. In the message, Governor Frémont called for a 100-man force to be organized to fight banditry along and near the border with Mexico.

Legislation
The most important, and contentious action of the session was the creation of three new counties: Cochise, Gila, Graham.  Of these, Cochise County generated the most objections. Creation of the county was opposed by interests in Tucson due to the diversion of tax income from their city to the new county seat. Tombstone had however managed to elect a disproportional level of representation to the session and was able to overcome the objections.  The new county's name also generated opposition as Representative Sharp of Maricopa County objected to the county being named for Cochise due to the "depredation and murderous attacks of that bloodthirsty savage."

The towns of Phoenix, Prescott, and Tombstone were incorporated. A variety of bond issues were additionally authorized to fund construction of courthouses, jails, and other government buildings throughout the territory.

Acting upon the governor's recommendation, the territorial bullion tax on mined products was repealed.  Frémont's request for a special force to fight crime along border with Mexico was refused.  The previous session's creation of a territorial lottery was repealed, and gambling by minors prohibited.

Members

References

Further reading
 

11
11
1881 in Arizona Territory
Territorial Legislature